Ren Guixiang (born 8 July 1981) is a Chinese retired para table tennis player. She has won five gold medals and one silver from three Paralympic Games (2000, 2004, and 2008).

She is a polio survivor.

Personal life
Ren is married to her national teammate Zhang Yan. They have a daughter together.

References

1981 births
Living people
Table tennis players at the 2008 Summer Paralympics
Table tennis players at the 2000 Summer Paralympics
Table tennis players at the 2004 Summer Paralympics
Paralympic medalists in table tennis
Medalists at the 2000 Summer Paralympics
Medalists at the 2004 Summer Paralympics
Medalists at the 2008 Summer Paralympics
Chinese female table tennis players
Paralympic gold medalists for China
Paralympic silver medalists for China
Paralympic table tennis players of China
Table tennis players from Anhui
People from Xiao County
People with polio
FESPIC Games competitors
21st-century Chinese women